Uranyl sulfate describes a family of inorganic compounds with the formula UO2SO4(H2O)n. These salts consist of sulfate, the uranyl ion, and water. They are lemon-yellow solids. Uranyl sulfates are intermediates in some extraction methods used for uranium ores. These compounds can also take the form of an anhydrous salt.

Structure
The structure of UO2(SO4)(H2O)3.5 is illustrative of the uranyl sulfates. The trans-UO22+ centers are encased in a pentagonal bipyramidal coordination sphere. In the pentagonal plane are five oxygen ligands derived from sulfate and aquo ligands. The compound is a coordination polymer.

Uses
Aside from the large scale use in mining, uranyl sulfate finds some use as a negative stain in microscopy and tracer in biology. The Aqueous Homogeneous Reactor experiment, constructed in 1951, circulated a fuel composed of 565 grams of U-235 enriched to 14.7% in the form of uranyl sulfate.

The acid process of milling uranium ores involves precipitating uranyl sulfate from the pregnant leaching solution to produce the semi-refined product referred to as yellowcake.

Related compounds
the hydrogen sulfate.
potassium uranyl sulfate, K2UO2(SO4)2, is a double salt used by Henri Becquerel in his discovery of radioactivity.

References

Uranyl compounds
Sulfates
Nuclear materials